Pleudaniel is a commune in the Côtes-d'Armor department of Brittany in northwestern France.

Population

Inhabitants of Pleudaniel are called pleudanielais, pleudaniellais or pleudanielois in French.

International relations
Pleudaniel is twinned with:
 Ballinhassig, Republic of Ireland

See also
Communes of the Côtes-d'Armor department

References

External links

Communes of Côtes-d'Armor